The Roman Catholic Diocese of Yokohama is a diocese of the Roman Rite of the western Latin Church of the Catholic Church.  Its cathedral is located in the city of Yokohama.  It is a suffragan diocese of Roman Catholic Archdiocese of Tokyo in Japan and therefore in Tokyo's ecclesiastical province.

History
There have been two dioceses in Yokohama.  On January 5, 1846, the Apostolic Vicariate of Japan was established. This became the Apostolic Vicariate of Northern Japan in 1876 and then was suppressed in 1891 to establish the Archdiocese of Tokyo.

On November 11, 1937, the Diocese of Yokohama was erected out of territory of the Archdiocese of Tokyo.  The new diocese covered eight prefectures of Japan: Kanagawa, Ibaraki, Tochigi, Gumma, Saitama, Yamanashi, Nagano and Shizuoka.  On January 4, 1939, four of those prefectures – Saitama, Ibaraki, Tochigi and Gumma – were moved to the newly formed Apostolic Prefecture of Urawa, now the Roman Catholic Diocese of Saitama.

Leadership
The Bishops the diocese have been:
 Bishop Rafael Masahiro Umemura (ラファエル梅村昌弘) (since 1999.03.16)
 Cardinal Stephen Fumio Hamao (ステファノ濱尾文郎) (1979.10.30 – 1998.06.15)
 Bishop Luke Katsusaburo Arai (ルカ荒井勝三郎) (1951.12.13 – 1979.10.30)
 Bishop Thomas Asagoro Wakida (トマ脇田浅五郎) (1947.03.25 – 1951.07.05)
 Cardinal Peter Tatsuo Doi (ペトロ土井辰雄) (Apostolic Administrator 1945 – 1947)
 Archbishop Jean-Baptiste-Alexis Chambon (ジャン・アレキシス・ジャンボン), M.E.P. (1937.11.09 – 1940.09.18)

See also
Roman Catholicism in Japan

Sources
 GCatholic.org
 Catholic Hierarchy

References

External links 
 http://www.cbcj.catholic.jp/jpn/diocese/yokohama.htm

Roman Catholic dioceses in Japan
Christian organizations established in 1937
Roman Catholic dioceses and prelatures established in the 20th century
1937 establishments in Japan